The Étang de Berre (in Provençal Occitan: estanh de Bèrra / mar de Bèrra according to classical orthography, estang de Berro / mar de Berro according to Mistralian orthography) is a brackish water lagoon on the Mediterranean coast of France, about  north-west of Marseille.

Geography
Created by the rise in water levels at the end of the Last Glacial Period (colloquially known as the last ice age), this small inland sea is composed of three parts: the principal body of water, the Étang de Vaïne to the east and the Étang de Bolmon to the south-east.

The Étang de Berre is fed with fresh water by the rivers Arc, Touloubre and Cadière and – since 1966 – by Électricité de France's . Two canals link it to the Mediterranean, the open air  leading towards Port-de-Bouc and the Canal de Marseille au Rhône which leads towards L'Estaque through the Rove Tunnel; the Rove Tunnel has been closed since 1963, after a section of the tunnel collapsed.

The Marseille Provence Airport is located in the southeast portion of the Étang de Berre, with its main runway extending into the water on reclaimed land.

Administration
Ten communes border the Étang de Berre: Istres, Miramas, Saint-Chamas, Berre-l'Étang, Rognac, Vitrolles, Marignane, Châteauneuf-les-Martigues, Martigues and Saint-Mitre-les-Remparts.

History
The ancient name of the Étang de Berre was Stagnum Mastromela, according to Pliny the Elder (Book III [34]).

References

Berre
Landforms of Bouches-du-Rhône
Eutrophication